Banque Cantonale Neuchâteloise is a Swiss cantonal bank which is part of the 24 cantonal banks serving Switzerland's 26 cantons. Founded in 1883, Banque Cantonale Neuchâteloise in 2014 had 12 branches across Switzerland with 264 employees; total assets of the bank were 9 979.04 mln CHF. Banque Cantonale Neuchâteloise has full state guarantee of its liabilities.

See also 
 Cantonal bank
 List of banks in Switzerland

References

External links 
 Official website

Neuchatel